Notoacmea pileopsis, common name black edged limpet, is a species of sea snail or true limpet, a marine  gastropod mollusc in the family Lottiidae, one of the families of true limpets.

Subspecies
The following subspecies have been named within this species:
 Notoacmea pileopsis pileopsis (Quoy & Gaimard, 1834)
 Notoacmea pileopsis cellanoides (Oliver, 1926): synonym of Notoacmea cellanoides W. R. B. Oliver, 1926
 Notoacmea pileopsis sturnus (Hombron & Jacquinot, 1841): synonym of Notoacmea sturnus (Hombron & Jacquinot, 1841)

Description
The length of the shell attains 14.7 mm.

Distribution
This marine species occurs off New Zealand.

References

 Powell A. W. B., William Collins Publishers Ltd, Auckland 1979 
  Nakano T. & Ozawa T. (2007). Worldwide phylogeography of limpets of the order Patellogastropoda: molecular, morphological and paleontological evidence. Journal of Molluscan Studies 73(1): 79–99
 Nakano T., Marshall B.A., Kennedy M., Spencer H.G. (2009). The phylogeny and taxonomy of New Zealand Notoacmea and Patelloida species (Mollusca: Patellogastropoda: Lottiidae) inferred from DNA sequences. Molluscan Research 29: 33-59.

External links
 Quoy J.R.C. & Gaimard J.P. (1832-1835). Voyage de découvertes de l'"Astrolabe" exécuté par ordre du Roi, pendant les années 1826-1829, sous le commandement de M. J. Dumont d'Urville. Zoologie

Lottiidae
Gastropods of New Zealand
Gastropods described in 1834